Anthony Michael Welsh (born 5 July 1983) is an English actor. He made his film debut in Red Tails (2012). On television, he is known for his role as Lucky Gordon in The Trial of Christine Keeler (2019–2020).

Early life and education
Welsh was born at Queen Charlotte's and Chelsea Hospital in the Hammersmith area of West London and grew up in West Ealing. He attended Drayton Manor High School. He began taking evening acting classes at Richmond Drama School when he was about 20 followed by a foundation course. He went on to train at the London Academy of Music and Dramatic Art (LAMDA).

Filmography

Film

Television

Video games

Music videos

Stage

References

External links 

Living people
1983 births
Alumni of the London Academy of Music and Dramatic Art
Black British male actors
English male film actors
Male actors from London
People from the London Borough of Ealing